Michael Young (born 11 February 1984) is an Australian former professional rugby league footballer who last played for the Newcastle Knights in the National Rugby League.

Background
Young was born in Camden, New South Wales.

Playing career
Young made his first grade debut for Newcastle in Round 4 2004 against St George which ended in a 48-2 loss.  Young's final game in first grade was a 38-26 loss against the Wests Tigers in Round 10 2008.

Personal life
Young married  Rebecca Anderson (now Rebecca Young) who played at inside centre for the Australian Women's rugby union team, the 'Wallaroos'.

References

External links
Newcastle Knights profile

1984 births
Australian rugby league players
Rugby league players from Sydney
Newcastle Knights players
Central Charlestown Butcher Boys players
Rugby league fullbacks
Rugby league five-eighths
Living people